The Becton, Dickinson and Company Corporate Headquarters is a corporate campus in Franklin Lakes, New Jersey. Built between 1986 and 1992, the buildings serve as the corporate and divisional headquarters of the Becton, Dickinson (BD) medical technology company. Designed by the architecture firm Kallmann McKinnell & Wood, the complex has won numerous awards for its unique modern design.

Structure
Located alongside Route 208, the campus consists of four buildings, the corporate headquarters constructed during phase one, the divisional headquarters including research laboratories constructed during phase two, and two partially concealed parking garages which contain 1,500 parking spaces for the company's employees. In planning the building, Becton indicated that it wanted a campus in the style of a country house and not in the dominant institutional style of other suburban office buildings of the era. The architects of Kallmann McKinnell & Wood designed the buildings around several atria with office space radiating to the sides of the finger-like structures to meet this goal. The parking garages were designed to blend into the surrounding area while still being visible, a technique inspired from Palladio.

The corporate headquarters building is three stories tall and consists primarily of offices and communal meeting areas. It totals . The first floor exterior is done in stone with windows in the shape of french doors. The second floor uses the same stone exterior with square windows in limestone settings. The third floor is faced entirely in glass divided into squares with metal mullions.

The divisional headquarters building is laid out in the same style with three finger-like wings connected by a traverse concourse. It totals . Each wing contains an atrium that is surrounded by either laboratory facilities in the two longer wings or a cafeteria and classrooms in the shorter wing. The exterior is done using the same materials at the corporate headquarters building, namely a honey colored brick and granite base, the limestone on the second level, and a copper overhanging roof that provides shades to the lower levels.

The sculptures present throughout the buildings and the surrounding garden terraces were designed by Michael Singer as part of a comprehensive site plan that saw the large open spaces on the campus designed by Morgan Wheelock and the smaller connecting spaces laid out by Richard Fleischner.

Awards
1998 AIA Honor Award for Architecture
1994 Boston Society of Architects Honor Award for Interior Architecture
1993 Boston Society of Architects Honor Award for Architecture
1991 BSA/Artist Collaboration Award
1990 AIA Honor Award for Architecture
1990 BSA Honor Award for Architecture
1989 Honor Award, NJ/American Society of Landscape Architects
1988 BSA Export Award, Highest Honor
1988 Excellence in Architecture Award, New England Regional Council
1986 Bridge Award, Steel Construction Prize, American Institute of Steel

References

BD (company)
Buildings and structures in Bergen County, New Jersey
Franklin Lakes, New Jersey
Office buildings completed in 1986
Office buildings completed in 1992
Headquarters in the United States
1986 establishments in New Jersey
1992 establishments in New Jersey
Postmodern architecture in the United States
Office buildings in New Jersey